Sitamarhi Institute of Technology is a government engineering college under Department of Science and Technology, Bihar. It is situated in Sitamarhi district of Bihar. Institute is affiliated with Aryabhatta Knowledge University. It was established in the year 2016.

Location 
Institute is situated in sitamarhi district of northern Bihar. campus is located around 140 km away from capital city of patna. institute is well connected by road and railways from Patna, Muzaffarpur and Darbhanga. Nearest airport is Darbhanga which is around 75 km from the campus.

Admission 
Admission in the institute for four years Bachelor of Technology course is made through UGEAC conducted by Bihar Combined Entrance Competitive Examination Board. UGEAC is based on the rank list of JEE Main conducted by National Testing Agency.

Departments 

The institute has five departments.

 Department of Civil Engineering
 Department of Computer Science & Engineering
 Department of Mechanical Engineering
 Department of Electrical Engineering
 Department of Applied Science and Humanities

Institute offers four branches in Bachelor of Technology (B.Tech) course with annual intake of 60 students in each branch.

 B.Tech in Civil Engineering
 B.Tech in Computer Science & Engineering
 B.Tech in Mechanical Engineering
 B.Tech in Electrical Engineering

References

External links 

 Official website
 BCECE Board website
 Aryabhatta Knowledge University website
 DST, Bihar website

Engineering colleges in Bihar
Colleges affiliated to Aryabhatta Knowledge University
2016 establishments in Bihar
Educational institutions established in 2016